The 2022–23 CAF Confederation Cup qualifying rounds began on 9 September 2022 and ended on 9 November 2022. A total of 50 teams competed in the qualifying rounds to decide the 16 places in the group stage of the 2022–23 CAF Confederation Cup.

Times were local.

Draw

The draw for the qualifying rounds was held on 9 August 2022 at the CAF headquarters in Cairo, Egypt.

The entry round of the 50 teams entered into the draw was determined by their performances in the CAF competitions for the previous five seasons (CAF 5-Year Ranking points shown in parentheses).

Format

In the qualifying rounds, each tie was played on a home-and-away two-legged basis. If the aggregate score was tied after the second leg, the away goals rule was applied, and if still tied, extra time was not played, and the penalty shoot-out was used to determine the winner (Regulations III. 13 & 14).

Schedule
The schedule of the competition was as follows.

Bracket
The bracket of the draw was announced by the CAF on 9 August 2022.

The 16 winners of the second round advanced to the playoff round, where they were joined by the 16 losers of the Champions League second round.

First round
The first round, also called the first preliminary round, included the 36 teams that did not receive byes to the second round.

|}

Kwara United won 3–0 on aggregate.

Gagnoa won 3–1 on aggregate.

ASC Kara won 4–2 on aggregate.

0–0 on aggregate. Real Bamako won 3–1 on penalties.

2–2 on aggregate. Hilal Alsahil won on away goals.

Fasil Kenema won 3–1 on aggregate.

Kigali won 1–0 on aggregate.

2–2 on aggregate. Kipanga won 4–3 on penalties.

Al Akhdar won 3–0 on aggregate.

Royal AM won 2–0 on aggregate.

Ferroviário da Beira won 3–1 on aggregate.

Elgeco Plus won 2–1 on aggregate.

ASFAR won 2–1 on aggregate.

Ashanti Golden Boys won 2–1 on aggregate.

Kallon won 4–0 on aggregate.

Future won 1–0 on aggregate.

Second round
The second round, also called the second preliminary round, included 32 teams: the 14 teams that received byes to this round, and the 18 winners of the first round.

|}

3–3 on aggregate. RS Berkane won on away goals.

Gagnoa won 1–0 on aggregate.

USM Alger won 4–1 on aggregate.

Real Bamako won 3–1 on aggregate.

Pyramids won 9–0 on aggregate.

CS Sfaxien won 1–0 on aggregate.

Al Nasr won 1–0 on aggregate.

Club Africain won 7–0 on aggregate.

Al Akhdar won 3–2 on aggregate.

1–1 on aggregate. Royal AM won on away goals.

Saint-Éloi Lupopo won 2–0 on aggregate.

Motema Pembe won 2–1 on aggregate.

Diables Noirs won 4–2 on aggregate.

Marumo Gallants won 4–1 on aggregate.

ASFAR won 5–0 on aggregate.

Future won 6–0 on aggregate.

Playoff round
The playoff round, also called the additional second preliminary round, includes 32 teams: the 16 winners of the Confederation Cup second round, and the 16 losers of the Champions League second round.

The draw for the playoff round was held on 18 October 2022, 11:00 GMT (13:00 local time, UTC+2), at the CAF headquarters in Cairo, Egypt.

The teams were seeded by their performances in the CAF competitions for the previous five seasons (CAF 5-Year Ranking points shown in parentheses):
Pot A contained the 7 seeded losers of the Champions League first round.
Pot B contained the 9 unseeded winners of the Confederation Cup first round.
Pot C contained the 9 unseeded losers of the Champions League first round.
Pot D contained the 7 seeded winners of the Confederation Cup first round.

|}

Saint-Éloi Lupopo won 2–0 on aggregate.

Real Bamako won 4–2 on aggregate.

TP Mazembe won 3–0 on aggregate.

2–2 on aggregate. Future won 3–2 on penalties.

ASEC Mimosas won 5–2 on aggregate.

ASFAR won 4–0 on aggregate.

Marumo Gallants won 3–1 on aggregate.

ASKO Kara won 2–1 on aggregate.

Young Africans won 1–0 on aggregate.

Motema Pembe won 4–1 on aggregate.

Rivers United won 6–1 on aggregate.

US Monastir won 1–0 on aggregate.

USM Alger won 1–0 on aggregate.

Pyramids won 3–1 on aggregate.

Diables Noirs won 6–2 on aggregate.

4–4 on aggregate. Al Akhdar won on away goals.

Notes

References

External links
Total CAF Confederation Cup, CAFonline.com

1
September 2022 sports events in Africa
October 2022 sports events in Africa
November 2022 sports events in Africa